The following comparison of video players compares general and technical information for notable software media player programs.

For the purpose of this comparison, video players are defined as any media player which can play video, even if it can also play audio files.

General

Active players

Inactive players

Operating system compatibility
This section lists the operating systems on which the player works. There may be multiple versions of a player, each one for a given operating system.

Features

Extended features

Consumer video format ability
Information about what video formats the players understand. Footnotes lead to information about abilities of future versions of the players or plugins/filters that provide such abilities.

Production video format ability

Audio format ability
Information about what audio formats the players understand. Footnotes lead to information about abilities of future versions of the players or plugins/filters that provide such abilities.

Container format ability
Information about what container formats the players understand. Footnotes lead to information about abilities of future versions of the players or filters that provide such abilities.

Streaming support
Information about which internet protocols the players understand, for receiving streaming media content.

Playlist format ability
Information about which playlist formats the players understand.

Electronic program guide format ability
Information about which Electronic program guide format the players viewable.

Subtitle ability
Information about what subtitle formats the players understand. Footnotes lead to information about abilities of future versions of the players or filters that provide such abilities.

Metadata ability
Information about what metadata, or tagging, formats the players understand. Most other containers have their own metadata format and the players usually use them. Footnotes lead to information about abilities of future versions of the players or plugins that provide such abilities.

Optical media ability 
Information about what kinds of optical discs the players can play. Footnotes lead to information about abilities of future versions of the players or plugins that provide such abilities.
Playback of Super Audio CD is not possible for any media player, because no suitable hardware exists.
All media players capable of audio CD playback will also play the Redbook core of any HDCD disc, providing no sound-quality benefits over standard audio CDs.

See also

 List of codecs
 Open source codecs and containers
 Comparison of video codecs
 Comparison of audio coding formats
 Comparison of video container formats
 Subtitles
 Comparison of portable media players
 Comparison of video codecs
 Comparison of DVR software packages

Related lists on other projects
 Open Source Toolset - short sections on Audio editing and Video editing
 Software - short lists of Ogg audio and video editors
 Help:Converting video - tools for manipulating audio and video

Notes

References

 
video player software
ITunes

de:Mediaplayer#Software